Thomas Leverett (July 10, 1765 – April 8, 1833) was a Vermont government official whose service included several years as Secretary of State of Vermont.

Biography
Thomas Leverett was born in Boston, Massachusetts on July 10, 1765, the son of John and Mary Leverett.  As an adult, he resided in Windsor, Vermont, where he was long active in public service.

A member of the Democratic-Republican Party, beginning in 1802 Leverett served as Windsor's postmaster.  He also held several other positions, including auditor of the state treasury, federal collector of internal revenue for the district that included Windsor, and superintendent of the state prison in Windsor.

From 1806 to 1813, Leverett served as Vermont's Secretary of State.

Leverett died in Windsor on April 8, 1833.  He was buried at Old South Church Cemetery in Windsor.

Family
On November 6, 1790, Leverett married Susannah (or Susan) Johnson (or Johnstone) at Christ's Church in Middlebury, Connecticut.  They were the parents of seven children: John (b. 1792), Charles Johnson (b. 1793), William (b. 1797), Susan (b.1800), George (b. 1802), Caroline Hallam (b. 1804), and Thomas H. (b. 1806).

References

Sources

Books

Internet

Newspapers

1765 births
1833 deaths
People from Boston
People from Windsor, Vermont
Vermont Democratic-Republicans
Secretaries of State of Vermont
Vermont postmasters
Burials in Vermont